The 1998 du Maurier Classic was contested from July 30 to August 2 at Essex Golf & Country Club. It was the 26th edition of the du Maurier Classic, and the 20th edition as a major championship on the LPGA Tour.

This event was won by Brandie Burton.

Final leaderboard

External links
 Golf Observer source

Canadian Women's Open
Sport in Ontario
du Maurier Classic
du Maurier Classic
du Maurier Classic
du Maurier Classic